
Gmina Dźwierzuty is a rural gmina (administrative district) in Szczytno County, Warmian-Masurian Voivodeship, in northern Poland.

Neighbouring gminas
Gmina Dźwierzuty is bordered by the gminas of Barczewo, Biskupiec, Pasym, Piecki, Purda, Sorkwity, Świętajno and Szczytno.

Villages
The gmina contains the following villages having the status of sołectwo: Dąbrowa, Dźwierzuty, Gisiel, Jabłonka, Jeleniowo, Linowo, Łupowo, Miętkie, Orzyny, Nowe Kiejkuty, Olszewki, Popowa Wola, Rańsk, Rumy, Sąpłaty and Targowo.

Other villages and settlements include: Augustowo, Babięty, Budy, Grądy, Grodziska, Julianowo, Kałęczyn, Kulka, Laurentowo, Małszewko, Mirowo, Mycielin, Przytuły, Rogale, Rów, Rusek Mały, Rutkowo, Stankowo, Szczepankowo, Śledzie, Targowska Wola, Targowska Wólka, Zalesie, Zazdrość and Zimna Woda.

References
Polish official population figures 2006

Dzwierzuty
Szczytno County